Acrochordus granulatus is a snake species found from India through Southeast Asia to the Solomon Islands. It is known as the little file snake, marine file snake, and little wart snake. It is completely aquatic and almost helpless on land. No subspecies are currently recognized.

Description
Acrochordus granulatus is the smallest of the three members of the family Acrochordidae, and is commonly called the "little file snake". Acrochordus granulatus is also the only Acrochord that permanently inhabits estuaries as well as coastal seas, dawning its other common name the "marine file snake". All members of Acrochordus are completely aquatic and nearly helpless on land. As with the other members of the genus, Acrochordus granulatus has uniquely spinose scales with an almost rough texture. Members of Acrochordus also possess specialized tubercles with nerve endings on the skin between their scales which provide an extra sensory organ used to feel water movements of prey. Acrochordus granulatus also have laterally compressed tails, and they can flatten dorsoventrally to assist in swimming. Acrochordus granulatus are the most marine of the Acrochordidae and have specialized sublingual salt glands similar to those found in the true sea snake subfamily Hydrophiinae. Despite this, they are still susceptible to dehydration at sea and rely on freshwater lenses built up on the surface of marine water for freshwater. Members of the true sea snake subfamily Hydrophiinae have been shown to exhibit this same behavior. Acrochordus granulatus are sexually divergent, with females being slightly larger than males.

Geographic range
Found from both coasts of peninsular India though Southeast Asia, the Indo-Australian Archipelago and northern Australia to the Solomon Islands. This includes Bangladesh,  Myanmar, Sri Lanka, the Andaman and Nicobar Islands, Thailand, Cambodia, Vietnam, China (Hainan), the Philippines (Luzon, Cebu and Batayan), Malaysia, Indonesia (Sumatra, Java, Borneo, Flores, Timor, Sulawesi, Ternate, Ambon, and coastal Irian Jaya), Papua New Guinea, the Solomon Islands the coast along northern Australia (Northern Territory and eastern Queensland). No type locality was given with the original description, although Smith (1943) gives "India" and Saint-Girons (1972) gives "Inde."

Feeding
Harold Voris reports field studies revealing a diet of Gobiodei, Eleotridae, Trypauchenidae and small crustaceans in the straits of Malacca. Due to the species' extensive range, the diet likely varies regionally. In captivity they have been known fairly non-preferential to take a variety of fish.

References

Further reading

 Greer, A.E. 2006. Encyclopedia of Australian Reptiles. Australian Museum Online. Accessed 16 August 2007.
 Shine, R. 1991. Australian Snakes, a Natural History. Ithaca, New York: Cornell University Press.
 Smith, M.A. 1943 The Fauna of British India, Ceylon and Burma, Including the Whole of the Indo-Chinese Sub-Region. Reptilia and Amphibia. 3 (Serpentes). Taylor and Francis, London. 583 pp.
 Wall, Frank 1921 Ophidia Taprobanica or the Snakes of Ceylon. Colombo Mus. (H. R. Cottle, government printer), Colombo. xxii, 581 pages

External links
 Acrochordus.com. Accessed 16 August 2007.
 Image of Acrochordus granulatus at the Institute of Toxicology and Genetics. Accessed 16 August 2007.
 Videos of A. granulatus feeding in captivity.
 Little Filesnakes at Life is Short but Snakes are Long

Acrochordidae
Snakes of Southeast Asia
Reptiles described in 1799
Reptiles of Western Australia
Reptiles of Bangladesh
Reptiles of Cambodia
Reptiles of China
Reptiles of India
Reptiles of Indonesia
Reptiles of Malaysia
Reptiles of Myanmar
Reptiles of Papua New Guinea
Reptiles of the Philippines
Reptiles of Singapore
Reptiles of the Solomon Islands
Reptiles of Sri Lanka
Reptiles of Thailand
Reptiles of Vanuatu
Reptiles of Vietnam
Snakes of Vietnam
Snakes of Australia
Snakes of New Guinea
Reptiles of Borneo